Zijan is a village in Bani Hushaysh District of Sanaa Governorate, Yemen. It is located just north of the historic fort of Dhu Marmar.

History 
The 10th-century writer al-Hamdani described Zijan as a source for waters that eventually reached al-Jawf. Zijan is also mentioned in the Kitab al-Simt of Muhammad ibn Hatim al-Yami al-Hamdani in connection with the nearby fortress of al-Fass, on Jabal al-Zalimah.

References 

Villages in Sanaa Governorate